Josef Staribacher (25 March 1921 – 4 January 2014) was an Austrian politician.

Staribacher died of pneumonia on 4 January 2014 at the age of 92.

References

1921 births
2014 deaths
Austrian politicians
Deaths from pneumonia in Austria